"1998" is an instrumental music track by British trance act Binary Finary originally released in the year 1998. The track was subsequently remixed numerous times under the title of the year the remix was produced (i.e. "1999", "2000", etc.) On the UK singles chart, "1998" peaked at #24 whereas "1999" peaked at #11.

12 years after its original release, in 2010 Armada Music published remixes by Vegas Baby!, Alex M.O.R.P.H., Dabruck & Klein, TyDi & Dennis Sheperd, Vadim Soloviev, Kaimo K, and a 2010 mix.

In 2012 the song was covered by Peace under the title "1998 (Delicious)" on their debut EP, EP Delicious. This version adds lyrics to the song.

On 9 September 2013 it was released through Armada Music a 15th anniversary package containing remixes by Jordan Suckley, Kissy Sell Out, Daniel Wanrooy, James Dymond, Tonny Nesse and an 'End of the World' rework.

A 20th Anniversary remixes package (including Mark Sixma, Dosem and Binary Finary remixes) was released under Armada Music label on 21 December 2018.

A remix by Jose De Mara was released through Armind in 2021.

Remixers
Adrien Aubrun
Alex M.O.R.P.H.
Dabruck & Klein
Daniel Wanrooy
Darren Porter
DuMonde (aka JamX & De Leon)
Dosem
Gouryella
James Dymond
Jon Craig & Jay Cosgrove
Jordan Suckley
Jose De Mara
Kaimo K
Kay Cee
Kissy Sell Out
Marc et Claude
Mark Sixma
Markus Schulz & Ferry Corsten pres. New World Punx
Matt Darey
Paul van Dyk
Protoculture
Richard Durand
Rodrigo Deem
Ronski Speed
Setrise
Tonny Nesse
twoloud
tyDi & Dennis Sheperd
Vadim Soloviev
Vegas Baby!

Other versions
2009 - Francesco Diaz & Young Rebels - 1998 (Original Mix / Christian Weber Remix)
2009 - Pacific Wave - 1998 (DJ Kharma & Mighty Atom Mix / DJ Phunk & 3am Mix)

References

1998 singles
1999 singles
2000 singles
1998 songs
Songs written by Tim Armstrong